Ever Hugo Almeida Almada (born 1 July 1948) is a Paraguayan football manager and former player who played as a goalkeeper. He is the current manager of Ecuadorian club El Nacional.

Almeida was born in Salto, Uruguay, but became a naturalized Paraguayan in 1975.

Career

As player
Almeida made his professional debut in 1967 at the age of 19 playing for C.A. Cerro of Montevideo. After a few years in the Uruguayan football league he was transferred to Club Guaraní of Paraguay. Shortly afterwards, in 1973, he received an offer from Olimpia. From that point on Almeida played with Olimpia for nearly two decades, setting a record for being the player with most appearances in the Copa Libertadores with 113, from 1973 to 1990, winning the tournament on two occasions (1979 and 1990). He also won the Intercontinental Cup (1979), Supercopa Sudamericana (1990), and the Recopa Sudamericana (1991), along with several Paraguayan national championships with Olimpia.

Almeida was an extremely good penalty saver, a skill that helped Olimpia win both international and national championships. Past the age of 40 he decided to retire and became a legend for the Paraguayan club due to all his contributions and titles obtained throughout the years.

As coach
After retiring as a player, Almeida worked in sports journalism and later became a coach of teams like Sol de América and Olimpia of Paraguay, Municipal of Guatemala, Nacional of Quito and Barcelona SC of Ecuador; and he even coached the Paraguay national team in 1999 during the Copa América. In August 2008, Almeida was chosen as the new coach of Olimpia replacing Gustavo Costas, marking his return to the club since 1993.
Almeida achieved success as a coach by winning championships in Paraguay, Guatemala and Ecuador.
He also coached Club Nacional of Paraguay.

In May 2010 Almeida was appointed as the new coach of Guatemala.

Honours

Player
 Olimpia
 Paraguayan Primera División: 1975, 1978, 1979, 1980, 1981, 1982, 1983, 1985, 1988, and 1989
 Copa Libertadores: 1979, 1990
 Copa Interamericana: 1979
 Intercontinental Cup: 1979
 Supercopa Sudamericana: 1990
 Recopa Sudamericana: 1991

Coach
Olimpia
 Paraguayan Primera División: 1993
Municipal
 Liga Nacional de Fútbol de Guatemala: 2001, 2002, and 2003
El Nacional
 Ecuadorian Serie A: 2005, 2006
 Ecuadorian Serie B: 2022

References

External links
 
 

1948 births
Living people
Paraguayan footballers
Uruguayan emigrants to Paraguay
Uruguayan footballers
Paraguayan Primera División players
C.A. Cerro players
Club Guaraní players
Club Olimpia footballers
Expatriate footballers in Paraguay
Paraguay international footballers
1975 Copa América players
Copa Libertadores-winning players
Paraguayan football managers
Club Olimpia managers
C.D. El Nacional managers
C.S.D. Municipal managers
Barcelona S.C. managers
Expatriate football managers in Ecuador
Expatriate football managers in El Salvador
Expatriate football managers in Guatemala
Association football goalkeepers
Guatemala national football team managers
1999 Copa América managers
2011 CONCACAF Gold Cup managers
Club Sol de América managers
Club Nacional managers
Club Libertad managers
Footballers from Salto, Uruguay
Club Guaraní managers
Águilas Doradas Rionegro managers
Sportivo Luqueño managers